Boston City Council elections were held on November 5, 1991. All thirteen seats (nine district representatives and four at-large members) were contested in the general election, and had also been contested in the preliminary election held on September 24, 1991.

At-large
Councillors Dapper O'Neil, Christopher A. Iannella, and Rosaria Salerno were re-elected. Councillor Michael J. McCormack had announced in March 1991 that he would not seek re-election; his seat was won by former Boston School Committee member John A. Nucci.

 Christopher A. Iannella died in September 1992; Bruce Bolling served the remainder of Iannella's term, as Bolling had finished fifth in the general election for four seats.

District 1
Councillor Robert Travaglini was re-elected.

District 2
Councillor James M. Kelly was re-elected.

District 3
Councillor James E. Byrne was re-elected.

District 4
Councillor Charles Yancey was re-elected.

District 5
Councillor Thomas Menino was re-elected.

District 6
Councillor Maura Hennigan was re-elected.

District 7
Councillor Bruce Bolling ran for an at-large seat; Anthony Crayton won the District 7 seat.

District 8
Councillor David Scondras was re-elected.

District 9
Councillor Brian J. McLaughlin was re-elected.

See also
 List of members of Boston City Council
 Boston mayoral election, 1991

References

Further reading
 
 
 

City Council election
Boston City Council elections
Boston City Council election
Boston City Council